The Ministry of Housing and Urban Poverty Alleviation was a ministry of the Government of India responsible for urban poverty, housing, and employment programs. It involved in national policy decisions and coordinates with Indian central ministries, state governments, and central sponsor programs. The Ministry was created in 2004 after splitting it from the Ministry of Urban Development.

The government, in 2017, merged the urban development and housing and urban poverty alleviation ministries as the Ministry of Housing and Urban Affairs (MoHUA)

Responsibilities

Overview
The Indian Constitution has allocated responsibility for housing and urban development to the state; and the 74th amendment to the Constitution delegates some responsibility to the local governments. The ministry is responsible for the national capital territory of Delhi and union territories. It also provides finances through federal institutions and allocates resources to the state governments. The ministry supports the country's external housing and urban development assistance programs.

Divisions
The ministry has administrative control over the National Buildings Organisation (NBO) attached office and the Hindustan Prefab Limited (HPL) and Housing and Urban Development Corporation (HUDCO) public sector undertakings. It is also responsible for the following statutory and autonomous bodies:
Building Materials and Technology Promotion Council (BMTPC)
Central Government Employees Welfare Housing Organisation (CGEWHO)
National Cooperative Housing Federation of India (NCHFI)
Principal Account Office (PAO)

Sectors for improvement
For poverty alleviation programs to be successful, the following sectors should realise improvements: Income generation, health, shelter, education, environment and infrastructure. Environmental Improvement for Urban Slum, Urban Basic Service programs, Nehru Rozgar Yojana, Shelter and Infrastructural facilities, and Low Cost Sanitation Night Shelter are examples of schemes to meet these objectives.

The Ministry has constituted a Committee on Streamlining Approval Procedures for Real Estate Projects (SAPREP) under the Chairmanship of Dhanendra Kumar, former Chairman of Competition Commission of India. Amongst other things, the concept of single window clearance as advocated by this committee report draw parallels with government's effort towards improving ease of doing business in the country.

National programs and legislation
The Government of India has launched various programs since its independence, such as some of the five-year plans, to alleviate poverty and address the widening income gap, both, amongst the upper and lower classes of society, and amongst the rural and urban parts of the country. For instance, the "Eighth Plan policy guidelines envisages integrated approach to alleviation of urban poverty and servicing the urban poor with basic facilities so that their quality of life improves."

As trends in the Gini coefficient reflect, the income gaps were not as pronounced until the early 1980s, but the situation has been continually getting worse since. Misplaced priorities of the Indian Government and bad planning of subsidy programs is largely responsible for this. Hosting the Commonwealth Games in New Delhi in 2010 that cost the exchequer an approximate , excluding the price of non-sports related infrastructure, is a case in point.

While newly launched programs like Mahatma Gandhi National Rural Employment Guarantee Act (MNREGA), National Rural Health Mission (NRHM), Food Security Act, Mid-day Meals and Bharat Nirman Yojana have demonstrated success in the initial stages, their performance over the long-run still remains to be seen.  The shortsightedness of the Indian government often leads it to launch populist programs that may not necessarily work well. Low-hanging fruit like increasing worker's minimum wage can go a long way in achieving the goal of poverty alleviation, but are yet to be taken up in spite of reminders from leading economists.

On 6 September 2012 by the Union Minister, Kumari Selja, introduced to the Street Vendors Act, 2014 in the Lok Sabha.

Ministers

See also
 Housing in India
 Illegal housing in India
 Jawaharlal Nehru National Urban Renewal Mission
 Poverty in India
 Slums in India

References

Further reading

External links
Official website

H
Poverty in India
Housing organisations based in India
India
Urban development in India